The Venture Capital Action Plan is created by the Government of Canada to facilitate a sustainable, private sector-led venture capital sector in Canada; as of 2015, it guides the distribution of $400 million in new capital to small- and medium-sized businesses.

See also
 Economy of Canada
 TSX Venture Exchange

References

2013 in Canada
 
 
White papers